Music is the debut studio album by American rock band 311. It was released on February 9, 1993. "Do You Right" was released as a single. The album was certified Gold in 1999 by the RIAA, having sold over 500,000 copies.

Background
There are only five tracks that were not included on 311's previous independent releases; "Visit", "Paradise", "Hydroponic", "My Stoney Baby", and "Fat Chance". However, all of the songs that had been previously released were altered, most notably "Do You Right", where nearly all of the lyrics were changed. SA also changed his main verses in "Freak Out", "Feels So Good" and "Fuck The Bullshit". The breakdown in "Plain" was completely changed musically, and the lyrics were re-arranged. The first pressing was originally manufactured and distributed by "Warner Bros. Records Inc." and thus bears the "WB" logo in the bottom right corner. Later issues were manufactured and distributed by "RED" in 1994, "Mercury Records" in 1996 and most recently "Volcano". The song "My Stoney Baby" has been featured in the 2008 film Harold & Kumar Escape From Guantanamo Bay.

Track listing

Personnel
Credits adapted from album's liner notes.

311
Nick Hexum – lead vocals, guitar, percussion
SA Martinez – lead and background vocals
Chad Sexton – drums, percussion
Tim Mahoney – guitar
Aaron Wills – bass

Guest Musicians
Daddy Freddy – vocals on "Nix Hex"

Production
Eddy Offord – producer, engineer
Mike Geiser – assistant engineer
Scott Ralston – assistant engineer
Joe Gastwirt – mastering

Certifications

References 

1993 debut albums
311 (band) albums
Albums produced by Eddy Offord
Capricorn Records albums